The Formigues Islands is an archipelago consisting of 16 small islands located three milesfrom the port of Palamós, Girona Province, Catalonia, Spain.  They lie facing the beach of Calella and Cap Roig. A lighthouse is located on the island of Formiga Gran (41º53'N 03º11'E).  The islands are sometimes covered by waves when the sea is rough. The name of the islands is derived from the Catalan word for “ant,” referring to their size.

Administratively, they are divided between the municipalities of Palamós and Palafrugell.

The islands consist mostly of calcareous rock, with various caves and crags filled with rich marine vegetation, especially multicolored sea fans.

The Battle of Les Formigues took place in the islands in 1285.

The Spanish Ministry of the Natural, Rural and Marine Environment planned to declare the islands a nature reserve in 2009, prohibiting fishing in a designated area of 420 hectares.  However, this was halted due to budgetary concerns.

References

Archipelagoes of Spain
Uninhabited islands of Spain
Marine reserves of Spain
Landforms of Catalonia